Mumtaz is a name commonly used in various countries in the Muslim world, mainly Afghanistan, Brunei, Malaysia, Pakistan, Bangladesh, India and Turkey. It can also be used as a female name. Mumtazah is a related female version. Its root is from Arabic language, meaning "excellent".

People with the given name
 Mumtaz (actress) (born 1947), Indian film actress
 Mumtaz (Pakistani actress) (born 1948), Pakistani film actress
 Momtaz Begum (born 1974), Bangladeshi folk singer
 Mumtaz Begum (actress) (born 1923), Indian film actress
 Syed Mumtaz Alam Gillani (born 1940), Pakistani politician
 Mumtaz Habib (born 1987), Afghan cricketer
 Momtaz Al Ket, Egyptian writer
 Mumtaz Mahal  (1593–1631), Indian empress
 Mumtaz Mufti (1905–1995), Pakistani novelist
 Mumtaz Hamid Rao (1941–2011), Pakistani television journalist and broadcaster
 Samad Khan Momtaz os-Saltaneh (1869–1954), Iranian diplomat
 Mümtaz Sevinç (1952–2006), Turkish actor
 Mumtaz Sorcar (born 1986), Indian actress
 Mümtaz Soysal (1929–2019), Turkish politician
 Mumtaz Shanti, Indian actress
 Mümtaz Tahincioğlu (born 1952), Turkish racing driver

People with the surname
 Anjana Mumtaz (born 1941), Indian actress
 Ismail Mumtaz (1880–1933), Iranian statesman
 Jamshid Momtaz (born 1942), Iranian academic
 Khawar Mumtaz, Pakistani women's rights activist
 Ruslaan Mumtaz (born 1982), Indian actor
 Salman Mumtaz (1884–1941), Azerbaijani literary scholar and poet

Arabic masculine given names
Iranian masculine given names
Turkish masculine given names